The Major League Baseball Constitution is a document under which the day-to-day operation of Major League Baseball is conducted.  It was originally drafted in 1903 as the Constitution of the National League and has since been amended several times, most recently in June 2005.

1876 National League Constitution
The 1876 Constitution of the National League consisted of 14 articles.  The League originally consisted of 8 teams:
Athletic Base Ball Club of Philadelphia, PA
Boston Base Ball Club of Boston, MA
Hartford Base Ball Club of Hartford, CT
Mutual Base Ball Club of Brooklyn, NY
Chicago Base Ball Club of Chicago, IL
Cincinnati Base Ball Club of Cincinnati, OH
Louisville Base Ball Club of Louisville, KY
St. Louis Base Ball Club of St. Louis, MO

Under the original constitution, the League had 3 objects: to encourage baseball, to  take care of the
interests of the players, and to establish and regulate the baseball championship of the United States.

The League was governed by a five-member Board from among whom was elected a President.  The Board also selected a Secretary and Treasurer.  Annual dues for each Club were $100.

Current Major League Constitution
The current constitution consists of the following sections:
Article I    - Formation and Duration of Constitution
Article II   - The Commissioner (9 sections)
Article III  - The Executive Council (4 sections)
Article IV   - Rules, Resolutions and Regulations
Article V    - Major League Meetings (3 sections)
Article VI   - Arbitration (3 sections)
Article VII  - Superseding Effect
Article VIII - Clubs and Territories
30 clubs, 2 leagues, 3 divisions (lists the clubs in each league and division)
Expansion, Contraction, Realignment, Divisions
Voluntary Termination
Involuntary Termination (12 subsections a-l)
Termination Procedure
Effect of Termination
Effect of Termination on Active Player Contracts and Reservation Rights
Operating Territories
a) National League (lists cities)
b) American League (lists cities)
Home Television Territories
Article IX   - Conduct of Championship Season and Post-Season
Schedule
Playing Rules
Parks not to be changed during season
Championship Season and Post-Season
All-Star Game
Article X    - Major League Central Fund
Maintenance of Major League Central Fund
All-Star Game Revenues and Expenses
Major League Club Broadcasts (4 subsections a-d)
National and International Broadcast, Copyright and Royalties
Payments from Central Fund, Books of Account (4 subsections a-d)
Termination of Central Fund
Article XI   - Miscellaneous
Fiscal Responsibility
Indemnification of officials
Major League Regulations

See also
 The Official Professional Baseball Rules Book

References

External links
Business of Baseball at the Society of American Baseball Research

Major League Baseball rules